The Unified Socialist Party (PSU), previously known as the Party of the Unified Socialist Left (PGSU), is a democratic socialist political party in Morocco.

History and profile
The Unified Socialist Party is a mixture of various movements that sprung up throughout the 1960s and 1970s. It first started with the spin-off "23 Mars" (a reference to the 23 March 1965 students' uprising), a radical, Maoist student fraction of the largest group in opposition to the Moroccan monarchy, the National Union of Popular Forces.

The Party of the Unified Socialist Left was founded by Mohamed Bensaid Ait Idder in 2002. The Unified Socialist Party was founded in 2005 as a merger of the Party of the Unified Socialist Left and the “Fidélité à la Démocratie” association.

The party boycotted the 2011 parliamentary election. Nabila Mounib is the secretary-general of the party, and the first woman to become a secretary-general of a political party in Morocco.

References

2005 establishments in Morocco
Anti-imperialist organizations
Left-wing nationalist parties
Political parties established in 2005
Political parties in Morocco
Progressive parties
Socialist parties in Morocco